J. Ryan Garber (born 1973) is an American composer of contemporary (classical) music.

Education
Garber began musical studies on the piano at age four. He subsequently became proficient on the bassoon and organ as well. His undergraduate and master's degrees are from James Madison University (Harrisonburg, VA). At JMU he studied composition from John S. Hilliard, a former student of Karel Husa and Donald Erb. His Doctor of Music degree is from Florida State University where his primary teacher was the eminent Czech-American composer, Ladislav Kubik. Other notable composers that worked (on a limited basis) with Garber on his music include: Donald Erb, Libby Larsen, Nancy Van de Vate, and Ellen Taaffe Zwilich.

Composing career 
Garber has composed numerous works for almost every genre, the most notable exceptions being opera. His music has been performed in many parts of the US as well as in Europe. For his compositions, he has been recognized and/or awarded from five national organizations.

He was named the "Tennessee Composer of the Year" by the Tennessee Music Teachers Association in 2002.

Teaching career
Garber taught composition, organ, bassoon, and music theory at Carson-Newman College in Jefferson City, Tennessee from 2000-2009.
Garber is currently teaching music theory classes at Walters State Community College in Morristown, TN.

Performing career
Along with saxophonist Richard J. Scruggs, Garber is part of the Garber-Scruggs Duo.
Garber has served as a church organist in Virginia, Florida, and Tennessee.
He plays bassoon in the Knoxville Wind Symphony.

Partial works list
See: Ryan Garber works

Concertino, for orchestra
Magnificat, for choir and orchestra
Concerto for Piano and Orchestra
Parabolisms, for alto saxophone and piano
Resonances, for solo piano
Another Twist, for baritone saxophone and piano, premiered by Linda Bangs, Darmstadt, Germany
An American Song Cycle, for soprano voice and piano
Equine Suite, for solo piano
Eine kleine BaritonSaxophon Musik, for baritone saxophone and piano, premiered by Jonathan Annis, Carson-Newman College

Compositions on CD
Resonances, on Resonant Edges, Capstone Records
Kettle Music, on 60x60, Vox Novus
Another Twist, on Kammermüsik für Baritonsaxophon, Bella Musica/Antes
Concertino, on Masterworks of a New Era, Vol. 12, ermMedia

Partial list of performers
Linda Bangs, baritone saxophone
Mark Hussung, piano
Richard Scruggs, alto saxophone
Salem Choral Society
Knoxville Wind Symphony
Knoxville Symphony Chamber Orchestra
Jonathan Annis, baritone saxophone

References

External links
Ryan Garber's web site contains a list of his works, performances, sample audio and music files.
Cadenza Musicians Directory Listing
American Composers Forum Biography
Knoxville Wind Symphony
Roanoke Times
Garber-Scruggs Duo

American male composers
21st-century American composers
Living people
1973 births
21st-century American male musicians